The 2007 Seve Trophy took place between 27–30 September at The Heritage Golf & Spa Resort in the Republic of Ireland. The team captain for Great Britain and Ireland was Nick Faldo, with the captain for Continental Europe being Seve Ballesteros. Great Britain and Ireland retained the trophy for the third consecutive time.

Format 
The teams competed over four days with five fourball matches on both Thursday and Friday, four greensomes matches on Saturday morning, four foursomes matches on Saturday afternoon and ten singles on Sunday. It means a total of 28 points are available with 14½ points required for victory. If the score finished at 14-14, then two players from each team would play the 18th using the greensomes format to find the winner.

Each member of the winner team received €125,000, the losing team €75,000 each, giving a total prize fund of €2,000,000.

Teams 
The teams were made up of four players from the Official World Golf Ranking list, four players from the European points list, and two captain's pick. However, there were a number of players who qualified for the trophy, but pulled out. These include: Henrik Stenson, Pádraig Harrington, Sergio García and Lee Westwood.

Day one
Thursday, 27 September 2007

Fourball

Day two
Friday, 28 September 2007

Fourball

Day three
Saturday, 29 September 2007

Morning greensomes

Afternoon foursomes

Day four
Sunday, 30 September 2007

Singles

References

External links
Coverage on the European Tour's official site

Seve Trophy
Golf tournaments in the Republic of Ireland
Golf in Leinster
Sport in County Laois
Seve Trophy
Seve Trophy
Seve Trophy